Dominique Lefebvre is a French politician.  He was the first deputy for Val-d'Oise's 10th constituency, which was established in the 2010 redistricting of French legislative constituencies.  He served from 2012 until 2017.

References

Living people
Deputies of the 14th National Assembly of the French Fifth Republic
1956 births
People from Roubaix